The Bani Yas International Tournament is a yearly football tournament that takes place in Abu Dhabi in the United Arab Emirates. It was founded in 2010.

Winners

See also
2010 Bani Yas International Tournament

External links

2010 in Asian football
Emirati football friendly trophies
Aln
Aln
Aln
Aln
Aln